Neoregelia macrosepala is a species of flowering plant in the genus Neoregelia. This species is endemic to Brazil.

Cultivars
 Neoregelia 'Aztec'
 Neoregelia 'El Toro'
 Neoregelia 'Escapade'
 Neoregelia 'Florida Flash'
 Neoregelia 'Gloheart'
 Neoregelia 'Mac Mar'
 Neoregelia 'Malibu'
 Neoregelia 'Pin Cushion'
 Neoregelia 'Pink Freak'
 Neoregelia 'Silver Cloud'
 Neoregelia 'Thelma Hodge'
 Neoregelia 'Wait A While'
 × Niduregelia 'Marechalii'

References

BSI Cultivar Registry Retrieved 11 October 2009

macrosepala
Flora of Brazil